Ochamchire or Ochamchira (Ochamchyra; , Ochamchira) is a seaside city on the Black Sea coast of Abkhazia, Georgia, and a centre of an eponymous district.

According to the 1989 Soviet population census, Ochamchire had 20,078 residents. After the Georgian-Abkhaz conflict of 1992–93, Ochamchire experienced a significant population decline due to ethnic cleansing of Georgians. Most of the internally displaced persons affected by the conflict have yet to return to the city. Ochamchire lies along the left bank of the Ghalidzga River where it enters the sea.

Climate 
Ochamchire's climate is humid subtropical, with mild winters and hot summers. The average annual temperature is 13.6 degrees Celsius. January's average temperature is 4.5 degrees Celsius while the average temperature in July is 23 degrees Celsius.

History 
Ochamchire evolved as a town from a small maritime settlement, which was a scene of fighting between the Russians and Turkish-Abkhaz forces in 1877.

The ancient Greek colony of Gyenos is supposed to have located near Ochamchire, though the identification cannot be considered as definitive because of doubts as to the actual location and the very poor preservation of the archaeologic site itself. The archaeological evidence demonstrates the influence of the Greek culture, if not necessarily Greek settlement starting from 6th century BC.

According to Itar Tass, in 2009, Russia planned to construct a new naval base for its Black Sea Fleet ( based at Sevastopol) in Ochamchire.

The former Georgian Soviet footballer Vitaly Daraselia was from Ochamchire.

International relations

Twin towns — Sister cities
Ochamchire is twinned with the following cities:
 Kostroma, Russia
 Bender, Transnistria, Moldova

See also
 Ochamchira District

References

 Georgian State (Soviet) Encyclopedia. 1983. Book 7. p. 623.

External links

Populated places in Ochamchira District
Sukhum Okrug
Greek colonies in Colchis